Orval Richard Steffen (May 15, 1921 – June 1, 1996)  was an American football coach.  He was the sixth head football coach at Adams State College—now known as Adams State University—in Alamosa, Colorado and he held that position for two seasons, from 1950 until 1951.  His coaching record at Adams State was 5–11–2.

References

External links
 

1921 births
1996 deaths
Adams State Grizzlies football coaches